Khaled al-Yamani is a Yemeni  politician and former Foreign Minister. He resigned from his post on 10 June 2019 due to differences over a UN-brokered peace deal.

See also

List of foreign ministers in 2018
List of current foreign ministers

References

1960 births
Living people
Foreign ministers of Yemen
Yemeni Sunni Muslims
People from Aden
Permanent Representatives of Yemen to the United Nations